Ricardo Eufemio Molinari (March 23, 1898 – July 31, 1996) was an Argentine poet. Molinari was born in Buenos Aires and was orphaned when he was five. Molinari's first work was El Imaginero (1927). He contributed to the avant-garde review Martín Fierro along with other Argentine writers as Jorge Luis Borges, whom he befriended. In 1933 he traveled to Spain where he met with the members of the Generation of '27. After he married, he worked in the National Congress of Argentina until his retirement. In 1958 he was awarded the Argentine National Prize for Poetry for his work Unida Noche and in 1968 became a member of the country's Academia Argentina de Letras. One of his most famous books is also one of his last: La escudilla (1973). The poetry collection Las sombras del pájaro tostado (1975) collects almost all of his works.

Major works
 Una rosa para Stefan George 1934
 El tabernáculo, 1937
 La corona, 1939
 El alejado, 1943
 Mundos de la madrugada, 1943
 Esta rosa oscura del aire, 1949
 Días donde la tarde es un pájaro, 1954
 Cinco canciones a una paloma que es el alma, 1955
 Oda a la pampa, 1956
 La hoguera transparente, 1970
 La escudilla, 1973

External links 

 Ricardo Molinari recorded at the Library of Congress for the Hispanic Division’s audio literary archive on Nov. 28 and 29, 1958

1898 births
1996 deaths
20th-century Argentine poets
20th-century Argentine male writers
Argentine male poets
People from Buenos Aires